The Sheffield Half Marathon is an annual half marathon held in Sheffield, England. It was started as a marathon in 1929 for two years, with a half marathon run at the same time. It restarted again 1946 after the Second World War. In 2003 it was reduced to a half marathon and 3-kilometre fun run. Moving from Hillsborough in 1991, the race started and finished at Don Valley Stadium, the stadium where Jessica Ennis trained, until the stadium's closure was announced in 2013. The race is gold graded by UK Athletics.

The 10 chosen charities for the 2009 event were Sheffield Teenage Cancer Trust, Motor Neurone Disease Association South Yorkshire, Macmillan Cancer Support, Myasthenia Gravis Association, RSPCA Sheffield, Multiple Sclerosis Therapy Centre South Yorkshire, Sheffield Wildlife Trust, Marie Curie Cancer Care, Sheffield Royal Society for the Blind and Bluebell Wood Children’s Hospice.

The 2009 Sheffield Half Marathon was sponsored by SIG Insulations and took place on 26 April 2009 at Sheffield International Venues managed facility Don Valley Stadium at 9:30 am.

The 2010 Marathon was held 25 April.

The 2014 race, on 6 April, was due to start and finish at the Don Valley Stadium, but was cancelled at the last minute due to the expected delivery of water bowsers not arriving. South Yorkshire Police initially set up roadblocks in order to try to stop those runners that had set off, but later decided to let them carry on for safety reasons. Despite the cancellation, organisers refused to refund runners, which one entrant described as "pretty disgusting". Deputy Prime Minister and Sheffield Hallam MP Nick Clegg has called for a "full explanation" of how the "farcical situation" was allowed to happen.

From 2015, the race relocated to the city centre, with the starting point on Arundel Gate and the finish line on Pinstone Street. The route took runners up Ecclesall Road and out to Ringinglow, before returning through Dore and back down Ecclesall Road. It was re-branded as the Plusnet Yorkshire Half Marathon as part of the Run For All Yorkshire Marathon series. The new route features over 850 feet of elevation gain in the first 5 and a half miles, including a category 3 climb. In addition to the overall race time, runners are timed on a single-mile climb (King/Queen of the Hill) and a 10 km mostly downhill "sprint" section.

Recent winners 
Source:

Half Marathon

Marathon

References

External links
 Official site
 ARRS Marathon race series

Sports competitions in Sheffield
Half marathons in the United Kingdom
Athletics competitions in England